3,4-Xylidine is an organic compound with the formula C6H3(CH3)2NH2. It is one of several isomeric xylidines.  It is a colorless solid.  It is a precursor for the production of riboflavin (vitamin B2).

The compound is prepared by two routes: hydrogenation of (2-chloromethyl)-4-nitrotoluene and reaction of the bromoxylene with ammonia.

Safety

In 2003, more than twenty US Army troops were allegedly exposed to 3,4-xylidine during the occupation of Iraq, leading to a number of health complaints.

References

Anilines